The Time of Remembrance and Reconciliation for Those Who Lost Their Lives during the Second World War (May 8 and May 9) is an annual international day of remembrance designated by Resolution 59/26 of the United Nations General Assembly on November 22, 2004. The resolution urges 'Member States, organizations of the United Nations system, non-governmental organizations and individuals' to pay tribute to the victims of World War II.

It begins on May 8, the anniversary of the date when the World War II Allies accepted the unconditional surrender of the armed forces of Nazi Germany and the end of Adolf Hitler's Third Reich.

In Ukraine (since 2015), May 8 is designated as a day of remembrance and reconciliation, but it is not a public holiday.

See also 
 Victory in Europe Day
 Victory over Japan Day
 Remembrance of the Dead

References

Aftermath of World War II
Observances honoring victims of war
Second World War
May observances